Edmundas is a Lithuanian masculine given name and may refer to:

Edmundas Antanas Rimša (b. 1948), Lithuanian historian, specialist of heraldics and sfragistics 
Edmundas Benetis (b. 1953), Lithuanian architect 

Lithuanian masculine given names